West End Football Club was a Scottish association football club based in Cowlairs, Glasgow.

History

The club was founded in August 1873 out of a cricket club. The club's name was often given as West-end or West-End.

The club competed in the Scottish Cup for four seasons between 1874 and 1878, winning its first tie against Star of Leven F.C. at home with three unanswered second-half goals, but being unlucky enough in its first season to be drawn against Queen's Park F.C.; West End lost 7–0 in a "rough" game, "West End considering that charging was the play".

The club's best run came in 1876–77.  The club beat Govan F.C. in the second round in a confusing game; the result was reported as both 1–0 and 1–1, presumably because of a disputed Govan goal, and Govan issued a protest to the Scottish Football Association, which was dismissed.  In the third round (last 21), West End drew at home to the Edinburgh Swifts; after the match the teams dined together at the Athole Arms Hotel.  The replay however did not take place.  West End was disqualified for an unstated reason and the Swifts were placed in the fourth round.

The club's last recorded fixture was against South Western F.C. in March 1878.

Colours

The club's colours were originally given as white and blue.  By 1874 the colours had changed to amber & black; from 1876 they were given as orange and black, but may have been the same kit.

Ground

The club's first ground was Burnbank Road, which it moved into in 1873, just before forming the football section; Blythswood F.C. also played cricket there, and adopted football in August 1873, which may have been an influence on West End doing so the same month.  

By 1876, the club had moved to Avenne Park in Cowlairs.

References 

Defunct football clubs in Scotland
Association football clubs established in 1873
1873 establishments in Scotland
Association football clubs disestablished in 1878
1878 disestablishments in Scotland
Football clubs in Glasgow